This is a summary of the results of general elections to Dáil Éireann, the house of representatives of the Oireachtas, the Irish Parliament, from 1918 to the present. With the exception of 1918, they were held using the electoral system of proportional representation by means of the single transferable vote.

General elections
Notes:
 To preserve space, the table is divided according to the participation of different parties.
 An empty cell (–) indicates that the party did not participate in the election.

Legend:

1918–1921
The first two elections were not held as elections to the Dáil. The 1918 election refers to the results in Ireland of the British general election, treated by Sinn Féin as the election for the First Dáil. The 1921 election refers to the separate elections to the House of Commons of Southern Ireland and the House of Commons of Northern Ireland, treated by Sinn Féin as elections to the Second Dáil.

1922
On 7 January 1922, in the Anglo-Irish Treaty Dáil vote, TDs constituting the 2nd Dáil divided 64–57 (4 not voting) in favour of the Treaty. Those voting were those who were elected for Sinn Féin, which were 125, as five were elected for constituencies in both Northern Ireland and Southern Ireland. The Treaty being passed, elections were called for a constituent assembly of the Irish Free State, which constituted the 3rd Dáil.

1923–1933

1937–1948

1951–1965

1969–1982

1982–1989

1992–2011

2016–

See also
List of Dáil by-elections
Elections in the Republic of Ireland
Elections in Northern Ireland

Notes

References

 Results
Republic of Ireland politics-related lists
Election Results